Stine is a surname. Notable persons with that name include:

Brad Stine (born 1960), American comedian and author
Brad Stine (tennis coach) (born 1958), American tennis coach
Charles Stine (1882–1954), American chemist
Charles J. Stine (1864–1934), American silent film actor
Clifford Stine (1906–1986), American cinematographer of horror films
Harry Stine (baseball) (1864–1924), American baseball player
Harry Stine (businessman), American businessman 
G. Harry Stine (1928–1997), American model rocketeer and author
Jean Marie Stine (born 1945), American science fiction author and publisher
Jeremy Stine (born c. 1980), American politician
Lee Stine (1913–2005), American baseball player
R. L. Stine (born 1943), American novelist of youth literature
Raychael Stine (born 1981), American artist
W. Roland Stine (1940–2003), American educator and politician

as a  middle name
W. Stine Isenhower (1927-2022), American politician

as a given name:
Stine Andersen (born 1985), Danish sports shooter
Sine Andersen (born 1993), Danish handball player
Stine Andresen (1849–1927), German poet 
Stine Ballisager Pedersen (born 1994), Danish footballer
Stine Baun Eriksen (born 1995), Danish handball player
Stine Bodholt (born 1989), Danish handball player
Stine Bonde (born 1988), Danish handball player
Stine Borgli (born 1990), Norwegian racing cyclist
Stine Bosse (born 1960), Danish businessperson
Stine Bramsen (born 1986), Danish pop vocalist of Alphabeat
Stine Brix (born 1982), Danish politician
Stine Dimun (born 1979), Danish footballer
Stine Egede (born 1964), Greenlandic politician 
Stine Fischer Christensen (born 1985), Danish actress
Stine Frantzen (born 1984), Norwegian footballer
Stine Renate Håheim (born 1984), Norwegian politician
Stine Lise Hattestad (born 1966), Norwegian freestyle skier
Stine Hjermstad Kirkevik (born 1976), Norwegian ski-orienteer
Stina Hofgård Nilsen (born 1979), Norwegian alpine skier
Stine Hovland (born 1991), Norwegian footballer 
Stine Jørgensen (born 1990), Danish handball player
Stine Hjelm Jacobsen, Danish singer and vocalist of Electric Lady Lab
Stine Johansen (born 1969), Norwegian sport wrestler
Stine Brun Kjeldaas (born 1975), Norwegian snowboarder 
Stine Knudsen (born 1992), Danish handball player
Stine Kufaas (born 1986), Norwegian high jumper
Stine Kurz (born 2000), German field hockey player
Stine Larsen (born 1975), Norwegian runner
Stine Larsen (born 1996), Danish footballer
Stine Nielsen (born 1991), Danish sport shooter 
Stine Bredal Oftedal (born 1991), Norwegian handball player
Stine Reinås (born 1994), Norwegian footballer
Stine Rossel (1975–2007), Danish archaeologist
Stine Skogrand (born 1993), Norwegian handball player
Stine Stengade (born 1972), Danish actress 

Danish feminine given names
Norwegian feminine given names